Shelf Life is a 1993 film directed by Paul Bartel. The final film Bartel directed before he died in 2000, it stars O-Lan Jones, Andrea Stein, and Jim Turner.

Plot
Following the assassination of John F. Kennedy in 1963, a Californian family head to their nuclear bunker. The film returns thirty years later and  40 feet underground with a typical day for the children, Tina, Pam and Scotty, still in the bunker, together with their now dead parents.

Cast
O-Lan Jones as Tina
Andrea Stein as Pam / Mrs. St. Cloud
Jim Turner as Scotty / Mr. St. Cloud
Paul Bartel as Various Apparitions
Justin Houchin as Young Scotty
Shelby Lindley as Young Pam
Jazz Britany as Young Tina

Production
The film originated as a stage show, written and performed by Jones, Stein and Turner. Bartel saw the show at the Lex Theater in Hollywood and the film went into production six weeks after the show ended. The film was shot on a very low budget.

The film is dedicated "For the Garys" in reference to the founders of Filmex who died in 1992.

Release
A work-in-progress was screened at the Palm Springs Film Festival in January 1993. The film was rejected by the Toronto Film Festival and Sundance Film Festival.

Reception
Todd McCarthy of Variety called it a "microcosmic commentary on vaunted family values and media generation" and that it "features some of the best direction in any of [Bartel]'s films".

References

External links

1993 films
Films directed by Paul Bartel
1993 comedy-drama films
American comedy-drama films
1990s English-language films
1990s American films